Ana Novac (June 21, 1924/1929 – March 31, 2010) was a Romanian-born writer.

She was born Zimra Harsányi in Dej in northern Transylvania and grew up in Oradea (Nagyvárad). Novac attended a Jewish school in Miskolc, Hungary. When Nazi Germany took control of Hungary in 1944, she was sent to Auschwitz. She also spent time in Kraków-Płaszów and other smaller camps and was able to maintain a journal during her time in the camps. She was eventually liberated at Chrastava in Czechoslovakia in May 1945. However, her parents and younger brother did not survive. Novac returned to Romania. She moved to Berlin during the mid-1960s, later settling in Paris.

Her journal was published as a book which was translated into a number of languages including French, German, Italian, Dutch and Hungarian. Its English title was The Beautiful Days of My Youth (1997). She also published a number of other books and plays. She died in Paris.

References 

1929 births
2010 deaths
People from Dej
Jewish Romanian writers
Hungarian Jews
Romanian women writers
Jewish concentration camp survivors